Humphry Davy School is a comprehensive school in Penzance, Cornwall, England. The school teaches 11 to 16-year-olds.

History
The oldest part of the main school building was completed in 1909. It was originally called the Penzance County School and opened with an enrolment of 130 boys on 24 January 1910. It later became known as the Humphry Davy Grammar School for Boys.

It shared a canteen with the Penzance Girls Grammar School (PGGS), further up the hill, and, in the late 1970s, a joint upper sixth form block was added on the playing fields to the North East of the school, South West of PGGS. In 1980 it merged with PGGS and Lescudjack schools, becoming a co-educational comprehensive school, with the name Humphry Davy School.

Much of the original building has been preserved and, in the summer of 2013, the school received funding worth over £300,000 to replace the sash windows with handmade modern versions.

In 2005 the school gained specialist status, as a Music College.

Notable former pupils
 Helen Glover (rower), Olympic gold medal and World Champion rower
 Sam Palladio, Actor and musician

Humphry Davy Grammar School for Boys 

 Francis Foster Barham, religious writer known as the 'Alist'
 Sir David Collins, educational administrator
 Michael Grandage, theatre director, Tony Award winner
 Alexander Halliday, British geochemist
 Quinton Quayle, Ambassador to Thailand since 2007, and to Romania from 2002 to 2006
 Rick Rescorla, whose bravery during the 9/11 attack saved hundreds of lives at the cost of his own
 Jack Richards, Surrey and England cricketer

References

Secondary schools in Cornwall
Foundation schools in Cornwall
Educational institutions established in 1910
Buildings and structures in Penzance
1910 establishments in England
Specialist music colleges in England